The President's House, Marion Institute was listed on the National Register of Historic Places in 1979.

It is a two-story frame residence at Marion Military Institute.

References

University president residences
National Register of Historic Places in Perry County, Alabama
Neoclassical architecture in Alabama
Residential buildings completed in 1912
Marion Military Institute